Télétoon Rétro was a Canadian French language Category B specialty television channel that was owned by Corus Entertainment. The channel was based on the former Télétoon programming block Télétoon Retro and was dedicated to broadcasting French-dubbed animated series that had premiered on television at least 10 years prior to their airing on Télétoon Retro. Along with its English language sister station, Teletoon Retro, combined, both were available in over 9 million Canadian households as of 2013, having the most subscribers among the digital Canadian specialty channels.

History
Télétoon Rétro initially started as a programming block on Télétoon. On November 24, 2000, TELETOON Canada Inc. (at the time, an equal joint venture between Corus Entertainment and Astral Media) was granted approval by the Canadian Radio-television and Telecommunications Commission (CRTC) to launch TELETOON RETRO, described at the time as "a national Category 2 specialty television service with English- and French-language feeds. The service shall present classic cartoons from Canada and around the world, including animated movies, specials, series and shorts which commenced production at least ten (10) years prior to their exhibition by the licensee." The channel did not commence operation and the licence expired.

Plans to launch the channel arose again in 2005, when on October 21, TELETOON Canada Inc. was given approval again to launch TELETOON Rétro, this time as a singular French channel with no English language feed.

The channel was launched on September 4, 2008 as Télétoon Rétro, promoted with select programs airing on Télétoon on Saturday and Sunday nights at 7:00pm EST. An English-language counterpart, Teletoon Retro, had already been on the air since October 1, 2007.

Along with Teletoon Retro, Télétoon Rétro rebranded on February 4, 2013. On March 4, 2013, Corus Entertainment announced that it would acquire Astral Media's 50% ownership interest in TELETOON Canada Inc. The purchase was in relation to Bell Media's pending takeover of Astral, which had earlier been rejected by the CRTC in October 2012, but was restructured to allow the sale of certain Astral Media properties in order to allow the purchase to clear regulatory hurdles. Corus' purchase was cleared by the Competition Bureau two weeks later on March 18. On December 20, 2013, the CRTC approved Corus' full ownership of TELETOON Canada Inc. and it was purchased by Corus on January 1, 2014.

On March 24, 2014, Télétoon Rétro launched Télétoon Rétro HD, a high definition simulcast of the standard definition feed.

On April 16, 2015, Corus Entertainment announced that it had acquired long-term, Canadian multi-platform rights to Disney Channel's programming library; the cost and duration of the licensing deal were not disclosed. Alongside the licensing deal, Corus announced that it would officially launch a Canadian version of Disney Channel; the service will consist of linear television channels in English and French, along with TV Everywhere and video-on-demand services for digital platforms.

It was decided that instead of launching a new channel to coexist with Télétoon Rétro, Télétoon Rétro itself would be rebranded as the French language Disney Channel. On September 1, 2015, Télétoon Rétro was replaced with Disney La Chaîne, to coincide with the launch of its English language counterpart, Disney Channel.

References

Retro
Former Corus Entertainment networks
Television channels and stations established in 2007
Television channels and stations disestablished in 2015
Digital cable television networks in Canada
Children's television networks in Canada
Defunct television networks in Canada
French-language television networks in Canada
2007 establishments in Canada
2015 disestablishments in Canada
Classic television networks